Payrin-Augmontel is a commune in the Tarn department in southern France.

Geography
The Espinat forms most of the commune's eastern border, then flows into the Thoré, which forms the commune's southern border.

See also
Communes of the Tarn department

References

Communes of Tarn (department)